Nikolai Ilyin may refer to:

 Nikolai Ilyin (sniper) (1922-1943), Soviet World War II sniper
 Nikolai Ilyin (Yehowist) (1809-1890), founder of an apocalyptic millenarian movement of the Yehowists